White Bear Lake may refer to:

Canada
 White Bear (Carlyle) Lake

United States
White Bear Lake (Minnesota), a lake in Ramsey and Washington counties in Minnesota
White Bear Lake, Minnesota, a city in Ramsey County
White Bear Lake Area High School
White Bear Lake Township, Pope County, Minnesota

See also
 White Bear (disambiguation)
 Bear Lake (disambiguation)